Litodonta is a genus of moths of the family Notodontidae erected by Leon F. Harvey in 1876.

Species
 Litodonta contrasta Barnes & McDunnough, 1910
 Litodonta hydromeli Harvey, 1876 (Harvey's prominent moth)
 Litodonta troubridgei Miller & Wagner, 2021

References

External links

Notodontidae

Moth genera
Taxa named by Leon F. Harvey